Alfred Franklin "Fred" Foote (July 16, 1878 – May 28, 1965) was an American military and law enforcement officer who served as commander of the 26th Infantry Division and was Massachusetts Commissioner of Public Safety.

Early life
Foote was born on July 16, 1878 in Mooers Forks, New York. He was orphaned at the age of nine. To make ends meet, he worked nights while attending public school. He graduated from Dixon College. At the age of 16, he moved to Holyoke, Massachusetts. In 1905, Foote married Ethel M. Starkweather. The couple had two daughters. In 1920, the Footes moved to Wollaston.

Prior to his military service, Foote worked as a journeyman plumber.

Military career

Spanish–American War and Border War
On January 2, 1896, he enlisted as a private in Co D, 2nd Massachusetts Regiment Infantry. At the outbreak of the Spanish–American War he was sent to Cuba. During the war he rose to the rank of sergeant. Upon his return to the U.S., he was promoted to first lieutenant. On November 18, 1911 he became a major and shortly thereafter was placed in charged of the 3rd Battalion, 2nd Infantry. He led the outfit during the Border War.

World War I
At the outset of the American entry into World War I in April 1917, Foote was made acting lieutenant colonel of the 104th Infantry Regiment. In 1918 he graduated from the Army General Staff College in Langres and was made a lieutenant colonel. That July he was promoted to colonel and given command of the 104th. He commanded the 104th during the Battle of Belleau Wood and the Third Battle of the Aisne. For his service in France, he was cited for meritorious service by Major General Clarence R. Edwards, commander of the 26th Division (the 104th's parent formation), was awarded the Silver Star by the Secretary of War, and decorated as a Commander of the Legion of Honour by the French government. In 1923 he was awarded the Army Distinguished Service Medal. The citation for the medal reads:

Peacetime
After the National Guard was demobilized, Foote was made inspector general of the 26th Infantry Division. In 1919, he led the 104th when it was called up by Governor Calvin Coolidge during the Boston Police Strike. On March 24, 1923 he was made a Brigadier General and given command of the 51st Infantry Brigade. On May 3, 1928 he was appointed major general in command of the 26th Infantry Division. He resigned from the National Guard on November 14, 1930 to focus on his duties as Commissioner of Public Safety.

Commissioner of Public Safety
In 1919 he was appointed by Governor Coolidge to a one year term as Commissioner of Public Safety. He was reappointed the following year. On November 25, 1925, Governor Alvan T. Fuller reappointed Foote to the position of Commissioner of Public Safety. He was reappointed a third time in 1930 by Governor Frank G. Allen. In 1933, Governor Joseph Ely, requested Foote's resignation after investigations were launched into his office by Massachusetts State Auditor Francis X. Hurley and the State Commission on Administration and Finance. He resigned on March 15, 1933, citing ill health.

Death
Foote died on May 28, 1965 at the Veterans Administration Hospital in West Roxbury.

References

1878 births
1965 deaths
Military personnel from New York (state)
American military personnel of the Spanish–American War
United States Army personnel of World War I
Recipients of the Legion of Honour
Massachusetts National Guard personnel
Massachusetts Republicans
National Guard (United States) generals
People from Clinton County, New York
People from Holyoke, Massachusetts
People from Quincy, Massachusetts
United States Army personnel of World War I
United States Army generals